Posolskaya is a rural locality (a settlement) in Kabansky District, Republic of Buryatia, Russia. The population was 785 as of 2010. There are 11 streets.

Geography 
Posolskaya is located 25 km southwest of Kabansk (the district's administrative centre) by road. Bolshaya Rechka is the nearest rural locality.

References 

Rural localities in Kabansky District